Jihad Cool is a term used by American security experts concerning the re-branding of militant jihadism into something fashionable, or "cool", to younger people through social media, magazines, rap videos, clothing, propaganda videos, and other means.

It is a sub-culture mainly applied to individuals in developed nations who are recruited to travel to conflict zones on Jihad. For example, Jihadi rap videos make participants look "more MTV than Mosque", according to NPR, which was the first to report on the phenomenon in 2010.

Addressing the issue of Jihad Cool has been identified as one of the best ways to tackle Islamic extremism.

See also
Jihadism and hip-hop
Jihobbyist
Reappropriation
N-word
Palestinian keffiyeh
Nazi chic
Communist chic
Che Guevara in fashion
Aestheticization of politics

References

Jihadism
Cultural appropriation
Popular culture